Kimberly Doran Eulner (born April 15, 1966) is an American Republican Party politician who has represented the 11th Legislative district in the New Jersey General Assembly since she took office on January 11, 2022.

A longtime resident of Shrewsbury, she graduated from Red Bank Regional High School and Washington College. She served on the Shrewsbury Borough Council.

In the November 2021 general election, Eulner and her running mate Marilyn Piperno knocked off Democratic incumbents Joann Downey and Eric Houghtaling, both of whom had served three terms in office.

Eulner was one of a record seven new Republican Assemblywomen elected in the 2022 general election, joining seven Republican women incumbents who won re-election that year to the Assembly and Senate.

District 11
Each of the 40 districts in the New Jersey Legislature has one representative in the New Jersey Senate and two members in the New Jersey General Assembly. The other representatives from the 11th District for the 2022—2023 Legislative Session are:
Senator Vin Gopal (D)
Assemblywoman Marilyn Piperno (R)

References

External links
Legislative webpage

Living people
1966 births
Republican Party members of the New Jersey General Assembly
Politicians from Monmouth County, New Jersey
People from Shrewsbury, New Jersey
Red Bank Regional High School alumni
Women state legislators in New Jersey
21st-century American politicians
21st-century American women politicians